Invisibility Cloak may refer to:

 Cloak of invisibility, a theme that has occurred in fiction
 Invisibility cloak (Harry Potter), a specific instance in the Harry Potter series
 Cloaking device, technology for partial or full invisibility to parts of the electromagnetic or acoustic spectrums
 Metamaterial cloaking, a type of cloaking using metamaterials
 Cap of invisibility (aidos kyneê in Greek), a mysterious helmet or cap that possesses the ability to turn the wearer invisible
The Invisibility Cloak, a short novel by Chinese author Ge Fei.